The 71st Scripps National Spelling Bee was held in Washington, D.C. on May 27–28, 1998, sponsored by the E.W. Scripps Company.

Competition

Twelve-year-old Jody Anne Maxwell, from Kingston, Jamaica, where she attended Ardenne High School, won the competition by correctly spelling the word "chiaroscurist". Maxwell was the second student from outside the United States to win, after Hugh Tosteson García of Puerto Rico in the 48th Scripps National Spelling Bee. Second-place went to 12 year old Prem Murthy Trivedi of New Jersey, a four-time participant, who also finished second the prior year. Third-place was taken by 13 year old Hirsh Sandesara of Northbrook, Illinois.

There were 249 spellers this year. Eighty-six spellers survived day one of the competition.

The first place prize was $10,000 (among other prizes), representing a doubling of the $5,000 top prize in place since 1990.

Rule change after this year
Jamaica was disqualified from the Bee the next year under a new rule that qualifying bees could not occur before February 1. This occurred after complaints that Maxwell had had too much time to prepare, because Jamaica's qualifying bee was over eight months before the National Bee.

References

Scripps National Spelling Bee competitions
1998 in Washington, D.C.
1998 in education
May 1998 events in the United States